Charles Camoin (23 September 1879 – 20 May 1965) was a French expressionist landscape painter associated with the Fauves.

Born in Marseille, France, Camoin met Henri Matisse in Gustave Moreau's class at the École des Beaux-Arts in Paris. Matisse and his friends (including Camoin, Henri Manguin, Albert Marquet, Georges Rouault, André Derain and Maurice de Vlaminck) formed the original group of artists labeled the Fauves (meaning "the wild beasts") for their wild, expressionist-like use of color. Camoin always remained close to Matisse. He painted a portrait of Matisse, which is in the permanent collection of the Pompidou Museum in Paris.

Charles Camoin's works have been widely shown in France and are in such major collections as the Musée d'Art Moderne de la ville de Paris in addition to the Centre Georges Pompidou and many of the French regional museums. In 1955, he was awarded the Prix du Président de la République at the Biennale of Menton. He died in Paris on 20 May 1965.

External links 

 Charles Camoin Bio – Findlay Galleries 
 Camoin's Cats
 Charles Camoin on ArtNet

Notes

1879 births
1965 deaths
Artists from Marseille
Fauvism
19th-century French painters
French male painters
20th-century French painters
20th-century French male artists
19th-century French male artists